Burnaby—New Westminster was a federal electoral district in British Columbia, Canada, that was represented in the House of Commons of Canada from 2004 to 2015.

Demographics
(According to the Canada 2001 Census)

Ethnic groups: 50.7% White, 20.2% Chinese, 10.6% South Asian, 4.3% Filipino, 2.9% Korean, 2.0% Aboriginal, 1.7% Latin American, 1.7% Black, 1.4% Japanese, 1.2% Southeast Asian 
Languages: 48.7% English, 1.0% French, 48.0% Other, 2.2% Multiple languages 
Religions: 21.1% Protestant, 19.1% Catholic, 6.1% Sikh, 4.6% Muslim, 4.4% Buddhist, 2.9% Christian Orthodox, 1.7% Hindu, 5.7% Other Christian, 33.5% No religious affiliation 
Average income: $27,356

Geography
The riding includes all of the City of New Westminster west of 8th Street and all of the city of Burnaby south of the following line: Kingsway to Sussex Avenue to Grange Street to Dover Street to Oakland Street to Sperling Avenue to the Trans-Canada Highway.

History
The riding was created in 2003 from parts of New Westminster—Coquitlam—Burnaby, Vancouver South—Burnaby, and Burnaby—Douglas.

According to the electoral boundaries set out by the 2012 Federal Electoral Boundaries Commission for British Columbia, the riding was dissolved, with various parts joining the new ridings of Burnaby South, New Westminster—Burnaby and Steveston—Richmond East.

Members of Parliament

Election results

See also
 List of Canadian federal electoral districts
 Past Canadian electoral districts

References

 Library of Parliament Riding Profile
 Expenditures - 2008
 Expenditures - 2004

Notes

External links
 Website of the Parliament of Canada
 Map of riding archived by Elections Canada

Former federal electoral districts of British Columbia
Federal electoral districts in Greater Vancouver and the Fraser Valley
New Westminster
Politics of Burnaby